The Charles C. Weldon House is a historic home located at Odessa, New Castle County, Delaware.  It is a -story, three-bay brick dwelling with a -story, two-bay frame addition. It has a -story, parged concrete rear wing. The main block has a stepped brick cornice and two gable, end chimneys. Also on the property is a mid-19th-century granary and an early-20th-century gambrel-roofed barn.

It was listed on the National Register of Historic Places in 1985. The nomination referred to it as the "J. Vandegrift House" or "High Hook Farm", names for an adjacent farm not on the National Register.

References

Houses on the National Register of Historic Places in Delaware
Houses in New Castle County, Delaware
National Register of Historic Places in New Castle County, Delaware